Émile Damais (4 March 1906 in Paris – 8 April 2003 in Ivry-sur-Seine) was a French composer and musicologist. A prisoner in the Stalag II B, Hammerstein / Schlochau (Poland)  during the Second World War, he composed there Ô nuit… for singing and orchestra. He was also a professor of music history.

Compositions 
 Sonata for violon
 Appassionato for doublebasse and piano
 O Nuit... for singing and orchestra (after the Mystère des saints innocents by Charles Péguy composed in the stalag in February 1942
 String quartet (1944).
 Symphonic sketch for saxophone and orchestra
 Concert Esquisse Symphonique for saxophone in Eb and piano
 5 divertissements pourophone for alto saxophone in Eb solo
 Litanies florales, mélody for voice and piano
 Petites Phrases for violin and piano on Amazon
 Motets published by the Schola Cantorum publishing department in Paris
 Passion according to Saint Matthew, premiered in Limoges in 1948
 Oratorio on a text by Paul Claudel, Le Chemin de la Croix for mixed choirs, large orchestra, solo soprano, tenor solo, bass and reciting, written during the war and given to the Concerts Pasdeloup in 1946
 Organ pieces like this Interlude for Christmas (Musique et Liturgie No 6, 1948)

Works

References

External links 
 Émile Damais on musiquecontemporaine.fr
 Biography
 Centenaire d'Émile Damais 
 Messiaen et les autres, compositeurs au stalag on Le Monde (13 December 2008)
 The Musical Legacy of Wartime France

1906 births
2003 deaths
Musicians from Paris
20th-century French composers
20th-century French musicologists
Music historians
French prisoners of war in World War II